The women's discus throw field event at the 1972 Olympic Games took place on September 9 & September 10. Armenia Soviet Faina Melnik was the strong favorite to win the gold. She has broken the world record five times since 1971 as well as being the European Champion in the same year. But twice in 1972 she had been beaten by Romanian Argentina Menis. In the start of the fourth round Menis lead with Melnik in fifth.

Results
All throwers reaching  and the top 12 including ties, advanced to the finals.  All qualifiers are shown in blue.  All distances are listed in metres.

Qualifying

Final

Key:  OR = Olympic record; p = pass; x = fault; NM = no mark

References

External links
Official report

Women's discus throw
Discus throw at the Olympics
1972 in women's athletics
Women's events at the 1972 Summer Olympics